The Sun-Ripened Warm Tomato Party was an Australian joke party.

It stood candidates in the first Australian Capital Territory Legislative Assembly election in 1989. Its manifesto was to 'ban gas colored fake tomatoes from the ACT'. It received 1.17 percent of the vote and its preferences went to elect Residents Rally candidates to the Assembly. Party registration laws that allowed this party and other similar parties (for example the Party! Party! Party! and the Surprise Party) to stand candidates in the Australian Capital Territory were changed to provide that parties must have 100 members and a constitution before being eligible to register.

References

External links 
ACT Electoral Commission 1989 results
http://aec.gov.au

Defunct political parties in the Australian Capital Territory
Joke political parties in Australia
Political parties established in 1989
Political parties disestablished in 1991